Black Chiney is a Jamaican sound system based in Miami, Florida. It consists of four Chinese Jamaicans: Supa Dups, Bobby Chin, Willy Chin and Walshy Fire. The Caribbean slang "Black Chiney" refers to this racial mix.

Black Chiney often travels around the world as a sound system for nightclubs, concerts and other party venues. The quartet also participates in sound clashes in their native Jamaica.

History
Before Black Chiney came to prominence, founding member Supa Dups (born Dwayne Chin-Quee) was a DJ at Miami's Power 96 radio station (WPOW 96.5) for two years, in his early teens. As Supa got older, he had an interest in music production. In fact, his aunt figured that he was so serious about becoming a producer, so she mortgaged her house in Miami and bought him an Akai MPC3000. Not long after, Supa began mixing dancehall riddims with hip hop (mainly Miami bass).

Bobby Chin (born Robert Lee) was a selector in Kingston, Jamaica before he migrated to the U.S. at the age of 21. He settled in Washington, D.C., and was a selector for the sound system "Earthquake". After a successful stint as one of the top selectors in DC, Bobby Chin moved to Florida where he joined a Tampa-based sound system called Poison Dart, of which Supa Dups was a member. Poison Dart travelled extensively throughout North America and the Caribbean.

After Supa and Chin left Poison Dart, the two began collaborating and they produced many dancehall/hip-hop mixtapes. In 1999, Supa Dups released the first mix CD entitled Black Chiney 1 - Enter The Dragon. This was the first time the duo used the name Black Chiney, as they did not have a nickname at the time. The mixtape sold in large numbers, and it was also big in the Caribbean. When Miami's DJ Khaled (WEDR 99.1) heard their mixtapes, he asked them to produce more. By the time a fifth volume mixtape was released by Supa Dups, Black Chiney was still known as a mix CD, and the mixtapes proved to be popular.
 
In early 2001, the pair finally went public as Black Chiney. Black Chiney enjoyed much success in Jamaica as a result of the mixtapes, but in the summer of 2001, they also earned respect from the sound clashes they took part in. In sound clashes, Chin was the deejay who battled his opponents on stage, whereas Supa would play a riddim as the selector. In 2002, at an annual event in Jamaica dubbed Fully Loaded, the reigning "king" Tony Matterhorn lost the sound clash against Black Chiney. In a rematch later that year in Miami, Matterhorn would be defeated by Black Chiney once again.

Since Black Chiney frequently tours around the world, they experienced some burnout. As a result, Supa and Chin recruited two new members to help them carry the load in 2003; Willy Chin and Walshy Killa. Willy Chin (born Warren Hoo) is actually the younger cousin of Supa Dups, and had about three years of prior experience as a selector. Walshy Fire (born Leighton Walsh) was mostly known for being the younger brother of Cricket legend Courtney Walsh, until he became a member of Black Chiney. Walshy Fire was born in Miami and raised in Jamaica. As a youth, he traveled extensively, and it gave him an appreciation for other cultures. Walshy was formerly a selector based in Brooklyn, New York, but now he shares duties as a selector for Major Lazer and Black Chiney.

In 2004, Supa Dups produced the first riddim under the group's newly formed Black Chiney Records. It was called Kopa, and it proved to be extremely popular. Artists such as Elephant Man, Vybz Kartel, Capleton, Nina Sky and Akon used the riddim, and some of these versions became hit singles. The Kopa riddim continued to get major club play through 2005, and in 2006, Black Chiney released Higher Octane. The newest riddim by Black Chiney is the Drumline/Timeline, released in 2007.

At 2007's Fully Loaded, Black Chiney spent their entire set insulting event organizer Sharon Burke, who did not pay them for their 2002 appearance. When Burke cut the group's set short, the crowd became unhappy and, ironically, had to be placated by Tony Matterhorn before the show could continue. This incident further proves the group's extreme popularity among Jamaican dancehall fans.

Since Fully Loaded in 2007 Black Chiney continues to tour the world and Founder Supa Dups is now a Grammy Award-winning producer for his work with Eminem and was nominated for another Grammy with Bruno Mars. Supa Dups has also done work for the likes of Sean Paul, Rihanna, Snoop Lion, Mary J Blige Drake Tyga and Estelle to name a few. See (Supa Dups)

Discography

Riddims
Kopa Riddim (2005)
Higher Octane Riddim (2006)
Drumline/Timeline Riddim (2007)
Doctor Bird Riddim (2008)

References

External links
Black Chiney's official website
Black Chiney's MySpace
Production by Black Chiney

Asian-American culture in Florida
Caribbean-American culture in Miami
Chinese-American culture
Jamaican-American history
Jamaican emigrants to the United States
Jamaican people of Chinese descent
Jamaican record producers
Jamaican sound systems
Musical quartets
Record production teams